John Levi is the name of several people including:
 John Levi (American football) (1898–1946), Arapaho Indian who played for the Haskell Indians
 John G. Levi, chairperson of the United States Legal Services Corporation
 John Levi (rabbi) (born 1934), first Australian-born rabbi